Stanley R. Christianson (January 24, 1925 – September 29, 1950) was a Marine Corps private first class who posthumously received the Medal of Honor for giving his life in a one-man stand against a ferocious attack which threatened to destroy his platoon in Korea on September 29, 1950.

The nation's highest tribute for gallantry was presented to his parents by Secretary of the Navy Dan A. Kimball in Washington, D.C., on August 30, 1951. The Medal of Honor was PFC Christianson's second decoration in 16 days of fighting in Korea. Just 11 days before he was killed, he was awarded the Bronze Star for another act of valor. The 25-year-old veteran of almost eight years in the Marine Corps also had been awarded a Letter of Commendation for meritorious service in the Pacific during World War II.

Biography
Born January 24, 1925, in Mindoro, Wisconsin, Stanley Reuben Christianson attended school in La Crosse County, Wisconsin, and farmed for a time before enlisting in the Marine Corps Reserve on October 2, 1942, at the age of 17.

Following recruit training at San Diego, California, Christianson took advanced training with the 2nd Marine Division and went overseas with that outfit. He fought at Tarawa, Saipan, Tinian, and Okinawa, and served with the occupation forces in Japan.

Discharged in December 1945, PFC Christianson re-enlisted in the regular Marine Corps three months later. He served at the Naval Air Station Pensacola Florida; as a Drill Instructor at Parris Island, South Carolina; at the Naval Ammunition Depot, Hastings, Nebraska; at the Brooklyn Navy Yard, Brooklyn, New York; and at Camp Lejeune, North Carolina, before going overseas to Korea with the 1st Marine Division in August 1950.

After participating in the Inchon landing, he earned the Bronze Star Medal on September 18, 1950. The citation said Private First Class Christianson, acting as an automatic rifleman during an assault, "fearlessly and courageously exposed himself to find the exact location of the enemy." Eleven days later, PFC Christianson was killed near Seoul during the UN September 1950 counteroffensive.

Medal of Honor citation
The President of the United States takes pride in presenting the MEDAL OF HONOR posthumously to

for service as set forth in the following CITATION:

For conspicuous gallantry and intrepidity at the risk of his life above and beyond the call of duty while serving with Company E, Second Battalion, First Marines, First Marine Division (reinforced), in action against enemy aggressor forces at Hill 132, Seoul, Korea, in the early morning hours of September 29, 1950. Manning one of the several listening posts covering approaches to the platoon area when the enemy commenced the attack, Private First Class Christianson quickly sent another Marine to alert the rest of the platoon. Without orders, he remained in his position and, with full knowledge that he would have slight chance of escape, fired relentlessly at oncoming hostile troops attacking furiously with rifles, automatic weapons and incendiary grenades. Accounting for seven enemy dead in the immediate vicinity before his position was overrun and he himself fatally struck down, Private First Class Christianson, by his superb courage, valiant fighting spirit and devotion to duty, was responsible for allowing the rest of the platoon time to man positions, build up a stronger defense on that flank and repel the attack with 41 of the enemy destroyed, and many more wounded and three taken prisoner. His self-sacrificing actions in the face of overwhelming odds sustain and enhance the finest traditions of the United States Naval Service. Private First Class Christianson gallantly gave his life for his country.
/S/ HARRY S. TRUMAN

Awards and decorations

See also

 List of Medal of Honor recipients
 List of Korean War Medal of Honor recipients

References
Inline

General

 
 

1925 births
1950 deaths
United States Marine Corps personnel of World War II
United States Marine Corps Medal of Honor recipients
People from Farmington, La Crosse County, Wisconsin
United States Marine Corps non-commissioned officers
American military personnel killed in the Korean War
Military personnel from Wisconsin
Korean War recipients of the Medal of Honor
United States Marine Corps personnel of the Korean War